In early 2016 there was a series of bombings in the mainly Shi'ite town of Sayyidah Zaynab and attributed to Islamic State of Iraq and the Levant.

January
On 31 January 2016, two suicide bombs and a car bomb exploded in the mainly Shi'ite town of Sayyidah Zaynab near Syria's holiest Shi'ite shrine, the Sayyidah Zaynab Mosque. At least 60 people were killed  including 25 Shi'ite fighters and another 110 people were wounded in the explosions. The Islamic State of Iraq and the Levant claimed responsibility for the attack. This is second time the Sayyidah Zaynab Mosque shrine has been targeted; in February 2015 two suicide attacks killed four people and wounded thirteen.

The death toll rose to 71, including 42 Syrian army and Shi'ite fighters as well as 29 civilians.

February
The February 2016 Sayyidah Zaynab bombings occurred on 21 February 2016 after Islamic State of Iraq and the Levant militants detonated a car bomb and later launched two suicide bombings, about 400 meters from Sayyidah Zaynab Mosque, a Shia shrine, believed to contain the grave of Prophet Muhammad's granddaughter.

134 people were killed, including children. Syrian media said the attack occurred when  pupils were leaving school in the area. Foreign led Syrian Observatory said 68 were killed. At least 60 shops were damaged as well as cars in the area. The attack, for which the Islamic State claimed responsibility, was the third attack in one year near the mosque.

References

Explosions in 2016
ISIL terrorist incidents in Syria
Mass murder in 2016
Terrorist incidents in Syria in 2016
Attacks on Shiite mosques
Violence against Shia Muslims in Syria
Massacres of the Syrian civil war perpetrated by ISIL
January 2016 crimes in Asia
Islamic terrorist incidents in 2016
Mosque bombings by Islamists